Jealousy is a 1929 American pre-Code drama film directed by Jean de Limur and released by Paramount Pictures. It is based on the French play Monsieur Lamberthier, by Louis Verneuil. The play was translated by Eugene Walter and ran on Broadway under the title Jealousy in 1928. The film version starred Jeanne Eagels and Fredric March, and is the second sound film and final motion picture featuring Eagels.

The film was initially shot with British actor Anthony Bushell as Pierre, but he was replaced by March at Eagels' insistence. Supporting actress Hilda Moore died before Jealousy was released, while the film's star, Jeanne Eagels, died of an overdose of chloral hydrate one month after the film was released.

Cast
Jeanne Eagels as Yvonne
Fredric March as Pierre
Halliwell Hobbes as Rigaud
Blanche Le Clair as Renee
Henry Daniell as Clement
Hilda Moore as Charlotte
Carlotta Coerr as Louise
Granville Bates as Lawyer
Virginia Chauvenet as Maid

Preservation status
No known prints of Jealousy are known to exist and it is now considered lost.

References

External links

1929 films
1929 drama films
American black-and-white films
American films based on plays
Films based on works by Louis Verneuil
Films directed by Jean de Limur
Lost American films
Paramount Pictures films
1929 lost films
Lost drama films
1920s English-language films
Films with screenplays by Garrett Fort
1920s American films